Baishō, Baisho or Baishou (written 倍賞) is a Japanese surname. Notable people with the surname include:

Chieko Baisho (born 1941), Japanese actress and singer
Mitsuko Baisho (born 1946), Japanese actress

Japanese-language surnames